Fabian Heimpel (born 21 August 1990) is a German international rugby union player, playing for the University of Cape Town RFC and the German national rugby union team.

Biography 
Heimpel made his debut for Germany against Portugal on 27 February 2010. He has also played for the Germany's 7's side in the past, like at the 2009 Hannover Sevens.

Heimpel was top scorer of the Rugby-Bundesliga in 2009–10, with 225 points. At the end of the 2010–11 season, Heimpel, together with his friend Florian Wehrspann, moved to South Africa for a year, to join University of Cape Town RFC, a team the former German international Bodo Sieber used to play for, but opted to return to Germany early.

Heimpel was one of four German rugby players, together with Mustafa Güngör, Raphael Pyrasch and Bastian Himmer, who were promised by the DRV that they could join the Sportkompanie of the Bundeswehr, a special sports unit within the German Army.  This was, however, not the case, with no places available in the unit for male rugby players until 2012. This led to great resentment by the players towards the DRV and its then-chairman Claus-Peter Bach because all four had turned down other options in favour of the promised place in the Sportkompanie. Heimpel subsequently opted out of military service altogether and chose civilian service instead.

Heimpel competed for Germany at the 2022 Rugby World Cup Sevens in Cape Town.

Honours

Club
 German sevens championship
 Champions: 2009

Personal
 Rugby-Bundesliga
 Top scorer: 2009–10

May 2018- September 2018 Vice European Champion Grand Prix Series Moscow, Exteter, Marcoussis and Lodz
- August 2018 German Champions 7's, Heusenstamm
- April 2018 World Series Qualifier 7's, Hong Kong (finalist)
- September 2017 Oktoberfest 7's, Munich
- July 2017 German Champions 7's, Heidelberg
- June 2017 - July 2017 European Grand Prix Series Moscow, Exteter, Clermont and Lodz)
- April 2017 World Series Qualifier 7's, Hong Kong (finalist)
- June 2016 - September 2016 European Grand Prix Series Moscow, Exeter, Gdansk)
- July 2016 German Champions 7's, Heidelberg
- June 2016 Olympic Qualification Repechage, Monaco
- July 2015 German Champions 7's, Heusenstamm
- June 2015 - July 2015 European Championship Grand Prix Series Moscow, Bucharest, Manchester and Lyon
- June 2014- July 2014 European Championship Grand Prix Series Moscow, Bucharest, Manchester and Lyon
- June 2013 - July 2013 European Championship Grand Prix Series Bucharest, Lyon
- June 2012 - July 2012 European Championship Grand Prix Series Lyon, Moscow, Odense
- July 2011 Promotion from B Division to Grand Prix Series
- July 2009 European Championships Hanover 7's (debut)
- July 2009 German Champion 7's, Heusenstamm
- July 2008 German Champion 7's, Heusenstamm

Stats
Fabian Heimpel's personal statistics in club and international rugby:

Club

 As of 30 April 2012

National team

European Nations Cup

Friendlies and other competitions

 As of 8 April 2012

References

External links 
 Fabian Heimpel at scrum.com
   Fabian Heimpel at totalrugby.de
  Fabian Heimpel at the DRV website

1990 births
Living people
German rugby union players
Germany international rugby union players
RG Heidelberg players
Rugby union fly-halves